is a passenger railway station located in the city of Hachiōji, Tokyo, Japan, operated by the East Japan Railway Company (JR East).

Lines

Station layout
The station consists of a single island platform serving two tracks, with an elevated station building. The station has a "Midori no Madoguchi" staffed ticket office.

Platforms

History
The station opened on 1 April 1997.

Station numbering was introduced on 20 August 2016 with Hachiōjiminamino being assigned station number JH30.

Passenger statistics
In fiscal 2019, the station was used by an average of 18,695 passengers daily (boarding passengers only).

The passenger figures (boarding passengers only) for previous years are as shown below.

Surrounding area
 Nihon Bunka University
 Tokyo University of Technology
 Yamano College of Aesthetics
 Nippon Engineering College of Hachioji
 Katakura High School
  museum

See also
 List of railway stations in Japan

References

External links

 JR East station information 

Railway stations in Japan opened in 1997
Railway stations in Tokyo
Yokohama Line
Stations of East Japan Railway Company
Hachiōji, Tokyo